I Thought I Was an Alien is the debut studio album by French singer Soko, released in February 2012.

Release and promotion
Stereogum premiered I Thought I Was an Alien for online streaming on 13 February 2012. The album was issued to Belgian, British, Dutch, German, Italian, Irish, Luxembourgish, Polish and Swiss music stores on 17 February.

Track listing
"I Just Want to Make It New with You" - 2:19
"I Thought I Was an Alien" - 2:18
"People Always Look Better in the Sun" - 2:18
"We Might Be Dead by Tomorrow" - 2:41
"No More Home, No More Love..." - 2:36
"For Marlon" - 3:23
"First Love Never Die" - 4:22
"Treat Your Woman Right" - 4:19
"How Are You??" - 3:46
"Don't You Touch Me" - 3:23
"Destruction of the Disgusting Ugly Hate" - 3:55
"Happy Hippie Birthday" - 4:01
"I've Been Alone Too Long" - 4:44
"Why Don't You Eat Me Now, You Can" - 1:28
"You Have a Power on Me" - 2:49

Chart positions

References

2012 debut albums
Because Music albums
Soko (singer) albums